Gomba is a district in Central Uganda.

Location
Gomba District is bordered by Mubende District to the west and north, Mityana District to the northeast and Butambala District to the east. Kalungu District, Bukomansimbi District and Sembabule District lie to the south of Gomba District. The coordinates of the district are:00 11N, 31 55E. (Latitude:0.1750; Longitude:31.9100).

Overview
Gomba District was created in 2010 by Act of Parliament, when Mpigi District was split into three: (a) Gomba District, (b) Butambala District and (c) Mpigi District. The town of Kanoni was selected to be the district headquarters. The district became operational on 1 July 2010. Generally, Gomba District is a rural district which receives lower precipitation than the districts of Butambala and Mpigi. Livestock farming is a major economic activity in the district supplemented with subsistence agriculture.

Population
In 1991, the national population census estimated the district population at about 119,550. The next census in 2002 estimated the population of Gomba District at approximately 133,300. In 2012, the estimated population in the district was about 152,800.

See also

References

External links
 Gomba District Webpage

 
Districts of Uganda
Central Region, Uganda